This Age of Silence is the debut album of heavy metal band, Anterior. It  was released by Metal Blade Records and the production was done by Tim Hamill and the band itself.

Track listing
"Ghosts of Dawn" - 1:36 (Instrumental)
"The Silent Divide" - 6:31
"Dead Divine" - 5:58
"Days of Deliverance" - 4:06
"Human Hive" - 5:31
"Stir of Echoes" - 2:14 (Instrumental)
"Scar City" - 6:12
"Seraph" - 6:32
"This Age of Silence" - 4:29
"Technical Difficulties" (Instrumental; Racer X cover; Japanese bonus track)

Notes
All lyrics written and arranged by Leon Kemp and Luke Davies.
All music written and arranged by Leon Kemp.
All songs recorded and mixed at Sonic One Studios. Track 6, recorded in Gardener's Bathroom.

Personnel
Anterior
 Luke Davies - Vocals
 Leon Kemp - Guitar
 James Britton - Bass
 Ross Andrews - Drums

Touring personnel
 Steven Nixon - Guitar - Nixon joined the band as a full-time member in September 2007, after the album had been released. Guitarist Leon Kemp recorded all guitar parts on the album.

Additional personnel
 Tim Hamill - Engineer, Producer, Album Mix
 Brad Vance - Album Mastering
 Brian Ames - Cover Artwork & Layout

References

2007 debut albums
Anterior (band) albums
Metal Blade Records albums